Richard (also Ritchie, Rich  or Dick) Sutton may refer to:

Politicians
Richard Sutton (MP, died 1634), MP for Newport, Isle of Wight and Newtown, Isle of Wight
Richard Sutton (British Army officer) (1674–1737), British brigadier and Member of Parliament for Newark; UK ambassador to Denmark
Sir Richard Sutton, 1st Baronet (1733–1802), English politician
Richard Sutton (Canadian politician) (c. 1815–1870), member of the Legislative Assembly of New Brunswick
Dick Sutton (1901–1982), Canadian politician
Richard Ike Sutton (1915-2001), American politician

Sportsmen
Richard Sutton (footballer) (born 1965), English former footballer
Ritchie Sutton (born 1986), English footballer

Others
Sir Richard Sutton (lawyer) (died c. 1524), English lawyer, co-founder of Brasenose College, Oxford
Richard Charles Sutton (1834–1915), architect based in Nottingham, England
Richard Lightburn Sutton (1878–1952), American dermatologist
Richard John Sutton (1938–2009), New Zealand legal academic and chess player
Richard S. Sutton (active from 1978), Canadian computer scientist
Richard Sutton (actor) (born 1978), British actor
The Sutton baronets
Sir Richard Sutton, 4th Baronet (1821–1878), English cricketer and army officer